In celestial mechanics, Lambert's problem is concerned with the determination of an orbit from two position vectors and the time of flight, posed in the 18th century by Johann Heinrich Lambert and formally solved with mathematical proof by Joseph-Louis Lagrange. It has important applications in the areas of rendezvous, targeting, guidance, and preliminary orbit determination.

Suppose a body under the influence of a central gravitational force is observed to travel from point P1 on its conic trajectory, to a point P2 in a time T. The time of flight is related to other variables by Lambert's theorem, which states:

The transfer time of a body moving between two points on a conic trajectory is a function only of the sum of the distances of the two points from the origin of the force, the linear distance between the points, and the semimajor axis of the conic.

Stated another way, Lambert's problem is the boundary value problem for the differential equation

of the two-body problem when the mass of one body is infinitesimal; this subset of the two-body problem is known as the Kepler orbit.

The precise formulation of Lambert's problem is as follows:

Two different times  and two position vectors  are given.

Find the solution  satisfying the differential equation above for which

Initial geometrical analysis

The three points
 , the centre of attraction,
 , the point corresponding to vector ,
 , the point corresponding to vector ,

The value  is positive or negative depending on which of the points  and  that is furthest away from the point .

This hyperbola is illustrated in figure 2.

Relative the usual canonical coordinate system defined by the major and minor axis of the hyperbola its equation is

with

For any point  on the other branch of the hyperbola corresponding relation is

i.e.

The ellipse corresponding to an arbitrary selected point  is displayed in figure 3.

Solution for an assumed elliptic transfer orbit 

First one separates the cases of having the orbital pole in the direction  or in the direction . In the first case the transfer angle  for the first passage through  will be in the interval  and in the second case it will be in the interval . Then  will continue to pass through  every orbital revolution.

In case  is zero, i.e.  and  have opposite directions, all orbital planes containing corresponding line are equally adequate and the transfer angle  for the first passage through  will be .

and the semi-major axis (with sign!) of the hyperbola discussed above is

The eccentricity (with sign!) for the hyperbola is

and the semi-minor axis is

The coordinates of the point  relative the canonical coordinate system for the hyperbola are (note that  has the sign of )

where

The distance between the foci is

and the eccentricity is consequently

The true anomaly  at point  depends on the direction of motion, i.e. if  is positive or negative. In both cases one has that

where

If  is positive then

If  is negative then

With
semi-major axis
eccentricity
initial true anomaly
being known functions of the parameter y the time for the true anomaly to increase with the amount  is also a known function of y. If  is in the range that can be obtained with an elliptic Kepler orbit corresponding y value can then be found using an iterative algorithm.

() is replaced by

and is replaced by

Numerical example

Assume the following values for an Earth centered Kepler orbit
r1 = 10000 km
r2 = 16000 km
α = 100°

These are the numerical values that correspond to figures 1, 2, and 3.

Selecting the parameter y as 30000 km one gets a transfer time of 3072 seconds assuming the gravitational constant to be  = 398603 km3/s2. Corresponding orbital elements are
semi-major axis = 23001 km
eccentricity = 0.566613
true anomaly at time t1 = −7.577°
true anomaly at time t2 = 92.423°

This y-value corresponds to Figure 3.

With
r1 = 10000 km
r2 = 16000 km
α = 260°

one gets the same ellipse with the opposite direction of motion, i.e.

true anomaly at time t1 = 7.577°
true anomaly at time t2 = 267.577° = 360° − 92.423°

and a transfer time of 31645 seconds.

The radial and tangential velocity components can then be computed with the formulas (see the Kepler orbit article)

The transfer times from P1 to P2 for other values of y are displayed in Figure 4.

Practical applications

The most typical use of this algorithm to solve Lambert's problem is certainly for the design of interplanetary missions. A spacecraft traveling from the Earth to for example Mars can in first approximation be considered to follow a heliocentric elliptic Kepler orbit from the position of the Earth at the time of launch to the position of Mars at the time of arrival. By comparing the initial and the final velocity vector of this heliocentric Kepler orbit with corresponding velocity vectors for the Earth and Mars a quite good estimate of the required launch energy and of the maneuvers needed for the capture at Mars can be obtained. This approach is often used in conjunction with the patched conic approximation.

This is also a method for orbit determination. If two positions of a spacecraft at different times are known with good precision (for example by GPS fix) the complete orbit can be derived with this algorithm, i.e. an interpolation and an extrapolation of these two position fixes is obtained.

Parametrization of the transfer trajectories
It is possible to parametrize all possible orbits passing through the two points  and  using a single parameter .

The semi-latus rectum  is given by 

The eccentricity vector  is given by 
where  is the normal to the orbit. Two special values of  exists

The extremal : 

The  that produces a parabola:

Open source code
 From MATLAB central
 PyKEP a Python library for space flight mechanics and astrodynamics (contains a Lambert's solver, implemented in C++ and exposed to python via boost python)

References

External links

 Lambert's theorem through an affine lens. Paper by Alain Albouy containing a modern discussion of Lambert's problem and a historical timeline. 
 Revisiting Lambert's Problem. Paper by Dario Izzo containing an algorithm for providing an accurate guess for the householder iterative method that is as accurate as Gooding's Procedure while computationally more efficient. 
Orbits
Conic sections
Astrodynamics